This is a list of Number 1 hit singles in 1970 in New Zealand, starting with the first chart dated, 16 January 1970.

Chart 

Key
 – Single of New Zealand origin

External links
 The Official NZ Music Chart, RIANZ website

1970 in New Zealand
1970 record charts
1970
1970s in New Zealand music